The Achwa River is a river of Uganda in eastern Africa. It flows through the northern central part of the country, draining much of Uganda's northern plateau and northeastern highlands, before crossing the border into South Sudan where it joins the White Nile. In South Sudan it is known as the Aswa River.

Rivers of South Sudan
Rivers of Uganda
Tributaries of the Nile